Muncho Lake Provincial Park is a provincial park in British Columbia, Canada, located on the Alaska Highway as it transits the northernmost Canadian Rockies west of Fort Nelson. The park is part of the larger Muskwa-Kechika Management Area. It is named after Muncho Lake, which is in the park and is both the name of the lake and of the community located there.

Folded mountains, geological formations, are visible above the road in the southern part of the park.

See also
List of Canadian protected areas
List of National Parks of Canada

References

External links

Provincial parks of British Columbia
Parks in the Canadian Rockies
Northern Interior of British Columbia
1957 establishments in British Columbia
Protected areas established in 1957